The R306 is a Regional Route in South Africa that connects the N9 between Willowmore and Aberdeen with the R61 between Beaufort West and Aberdeen.

References

External links
 Routes Travel Info

Regional Routes in the Western Cape
Regional Routes in the Eastern Cape